The 1956 United States Senate election in Oklahoma took place on November 6, 1956. Incumbent Democratic Senator Mike Monroney ran for re-election to a second term. He avoided a contentious Democratic primary when Lieutenant Governor Cowboy Pink Williams declined to challenge him and easily won renomination. In the general election, he faced Republican state party chairman Douglas McKeever. Even though President Dwight D. Eisenhower was winning the state handily, Monroney won re-election by a wide margin.

Democratic primary

Candidates
 Mike Monroney, incumbent U.S. Senator
 R. Os Doenges, school supply salesman
 O. J. Fox, perennial candidate
 George W. Wulff, Oklahoma City attorney

Dropped out
 Cowboy Pink Williams, Lieutenant Governor of Oklahoma

Results

Republican primary

Candidates
 Douglas McKeever, Chairman of the Oklahoma Republican Party
 Paul V. Beck, State Representative from Tulsa County
 Ernest G. Albright, Shawnee newspaperman
 Dan M. Madrano, former State Representative from Tulsa County

Results

General election

Results

References

Oklahoma
1956
1956 Oklahoma elections